Arthur Muhl (12 February 1913 – 17 April 1994) was an Australian cricketer. He played in two first-class matches for Queensland in 1935/36.

See also
 List of Queensland first-class cricketers

References

External links
 

1913 births
1994 deaths
Australian cricketers
Queensland cricketers
Cricketers from Brisbane